Ryshkovo is a rural locality and the administrative center of Ryshkovsky Selsoviet Rural Settlement, Kursky District, Kursk Oblast, Russia. Population:

Geography 
The village is located in the Seym River basin (a left tributary of the Desna), 87 km from the Russia–Ukraine border, at the southern border of Kursk.

 Streets
There are the following streets in the locality: 1-ya Solovyevka, 2-ya Solovyevka, 3-ya Solovyevka, Garazhnaya, Lugovaya, Pansionat imeni Chernyakhovskogo, Polevaya, proyezd 1-y Shkolny, proyezd 2-y Shkolny, Solnechnaya, Tenistaya, Tsentralnaya, Shkolnaya and Zarechnaya (471 houses).

 Climate
Ryshkovo has a warm-summer humid continental climate (Dfb in the Köppen climate classification).

Transport 
Ryshkovo is located on the road of regional importance  (Kursk – Zorino – Tolmachyovo), 3 km from the nearest railway station Ryshkovo (railway line Lgov I — Kursk).

The rural locality is situated 12.5 km from Kursk Vostochny Airport, 115 km from Belgorod International Airport and 211 km from Voronezh Peter the Great Airport.

References

Notes

Sources

Rural localities in Kursky District, Kursk Oblast